The International Blues Challenge (IBC) is a music competition run by the Blues Foundation.

Notable blues artists that have competed in the IBC over the years also includes Fiona Boyes, Eden Brent, Michael Burks, Tommy Castro, Sean Costello, Albert Cummings, Døvydas, Larry Garner, Zac Harmon, Homemade Jamz Blues Band, HowellDevine, Richard Johnston, Julian Fauth, Super Chikan, Susan Tedeschi, Southern Avenue, and Watermelon Slim. 

The 1994 event in particular had a lot of talent as Susan Tedeschi, Michael Burks (who won the Albert King Guitar Award) and a 16-year-old Sean Costello competed, although none of them were the eventual winner.

History
The competition began in 1984, then named the Blues Amateur Talent Contest. The idea was to give amateur or up and coming musicians a chance to be discovered and get a foothold. In 1986, the event was renamed the National Amateur Talent Contest and 17 bands competed. Prior to 1993, the IBC had a rule that performers had to make less than 50% of their income from performing. This rule was dropped that year and the following year the word “Amateur” was dropped from the name of the event. In 1995, the event was renamed “The International Blues Talent Competition” to reflect the expanded demand and over 40 acts competed. No competition was held in 1999 as the timing of the event was changed from the fall during the King Biscuit Festival to the January/February time frame. In January 2000, the first International Blues Challenge was held with 50 bands competing. As the event has grown in size it was decided to split the acts into two categories, Band and Solo/Duo in 2002. Now each year more than 200 acts from around the world gather on Beale Street in Memphis, Tennessee, to compete for the International Blues Challenge. 

Diunna Greenleaf and her backing band, Blue Mercy, won the competition in 2005. In 2006, the Joey Gilmore Band won the Best Band prize. The winners in 2008 were Trampled Under Foot. The 2010 winner of the top Solo/Duo prize was Matt Andersen. Grady Champion and his band won the Best Band title at the 26th International Blues Challenge in 2010, The 2011 winners of the Solo/Duo category were Georg Schroeter and Marc Breitfelder.

The band winner in 2014 was Mr. Sipp, with the solo winner being Tim Williams. In 2015, Eddie Cotton won the best band category, with Randy McQuay coming out on top in the solo/duo division.

Band winners

Solo/duo winners
In 2002, the Blues Foundation split the challenge into two categories and began awarding a winner in the Solo/Duo category.

Best Guitarist winners

Best self-produced CD award

References

External links
Official web page of the International Blues Challenge 
A Brief History of the International Blues Challenge

Blues music awards